The Fortymile River is a  tributary of the Yukon River in the U.S. state of Alaska and the Canadian territory of Yukon.

History
Prospectors named the river after gold was discovered there in 1886. The name reflected the distance of the river mouth from Fort Reliance, a former Hudson's Bay Company post upstream along the Yukon River. Miners eventually extracted more than a half-million ounces of gold from the Fortymile watershed. After the gold discovery, two Alaska Commercial Company traders, Jack McQuesten and Arthur Harper, built a post at the mouth of the river.

Between 1968 and 1978, Cassiar Mining extracted about a million metric tons of asbestos from three open pits along Clinton Creek, a tributary of lower Fortymile River in the Yukon. After abandoning the site, the company went bankrupt in 1992, and the territorial and Canadian governments and others removed or buried mine wastes, stabilized the creek banks, and worked to partly restore the land.

Wild and scenic designation
This included  designated "wild",  called "scenic", and  designated "recreational".

The Bureau of Land Management oversees the Fortymile Wild and Scenic River, accessible via the Taylor Highway in Alaska as well as an unpaved road branching from the Top of the World Highway in the Yukon Territory. Float trips, camping, and sightseeing are among the recreational possibilities in the watershed.

Boating
The Fortymile River main stem as well as the North Fork, South Fork, and other tributaries offer a variety of boating possibilities for experienced paddlers of rafts and kayaks, or experienced canoeists willing to portage around difficult rapids. The many runnable segments vary from Class I (easy) on the International Scale of River Difficulty to Class V (extremely difficult). In addition to rapids, dangers include overhanging or submerged vegetation and the high probability of confusing one bend in a stream with another—thus entering rapids disoriented and unprepared—without the aid of a map and compass.

One of the watershed's hydrologic features, the Kink, is an artificial channel that is part of a Class V rapids on the North Fork. Mining interests blasted the channel through a ridge in 1904 in order to expose  of the original riverbed for prospecting on dry land. The Kink is listed on the National Register of Historic Places as a significant engineering feat of the early 20th century.

See also
List of rivers of Alaska
List of rivers of Yukon

References

External links
 Fortymile Wild and Scenic River - BLM page

Rivers of Alaska
Rivers of Yukon
Rivers of Southeast Fairbanks Census Area, Alaska
International rivers of North America
Wild and Scenic Rivers of the United States
Tributaries of the Yukon River
Rivers of Unorganized Borough, Alaska